You're All Living in Cuckooland is Budgie's eleventh and final album. Released in November 2006, it was their first official studio album in 24 years. It was accompanied by a UK tour.

Track listing

Personnel
Budgie
Burke Shelley - vocals, bass
Simon Lees - guitar
Steve Williams - drums

References

Budgie (band) albums
2006 albums